Prague in Black: Nazi Rule and Czech Nationalism (2007) is a book by the American historian Chad Bryant about how Czech nationalism developed in the German-occupied Protectorate of Bohemia and Moravia during World War II. It received mostly favorable reviews.

References

2007 non-fiction books
Czech nationalism
Books about the Czech Republic